Mallothrips is a genus of thrips in the family Phlaeothripidae.

Species
 Mallothrips flavipes
 Mallothrips giliomeei
 Mallothrips indica

References

Phlaeothripidae
Thrips
Thrips genera